is a Japanese company specializing in the sale of manga magazines and goods related to the  anime and manga industry in Japan. Flex Comix is affiliated with Asian Groove and Soft Bank BB, forming the Movida Holdings joint-investment company. The company publishes two magazines: Comi Digi +, and Monthly Shōnen Blood, which has been suspended. Flex Comix also has four web manga magazine websites called: FlexComix Blood, FlexComix Flare, Comic Meteor and Comic Polaris.

Publications
 was later adapted into an anime short by AIC Frontier.
Broken Blade (ブレイク ブレイド, Bureiku Bureido)
Dekoboko Majo no Oyako Jijō (でこぼこ魔女の親子事情)
Dropkick on My Devil! (邪神ちゃんドロップキック, Jashin-chan Doroppukikku) was later adapted into an anime by Nomad.
God's Puzzle (神様のパズル, Kamisama no pazuru)
Hyakko (ヒャッコ)
Kaijin Kaihatsubu no Kuroitsu-san (怪人開発部の黒井津さん, Kuroitsu-san in the Superhuman Research & Development Department)
Love Tyrant (恋愛暴君, Ren'ai Bōkun)
Maid Deka (メイド刑事)
Megane na Kanojo (眼鏡なカノジョ, Glasses Girlfriends)
Musashino-sen no Shimai (武蔵野線の姉妹, Sisters of Musashino Line)
My Roommate Is a Cat
Nyan Koi! (にゃんこい！, Meow Love!)
Onsen Yōsei Hakone-chan (温泉幼精ハコネちゃん, Young Hot Spring Fairy Hakone-chan)
Pupipō! (プピポー!)
Rikei ga Koi ni Ochita no de Shōmei Shite Mita (理系が恋に落ちたので証明してみた, Science Fell in Love, So I Tried to Prove It)
Steel Fist Riku (拳鋼少女リク, Kenkō Shōjo Riku)
Those Who Hunt Elves 2 (エルフを狩るモノたち, Erufu wo Karu Mono-tachi) 
True Tears (トゥルーティアーズ, Turū Tiāzu)
The White Mage Doesn't Want to Raise the Hero's Level (白魔術師は勇者のレベルを上げたくない, Shiro Majutsu-shi wa Yuusha no Reberu o Agetakunai)
Young Gun Carnaval (ヤングガン・カルナバル, Yanggugan Karunabaru)

References

External links
Official website 

Book publishing companies in Tokyo
Comic book publishing companies in Tokyo
Magazine publishing companies in Tokyo